The canton of Alès-3 is an administrative division of the Gard department, southern France. It was created at the French canton reorganisation which came into effect in March 2015. Its seat is in Alès.

It consists of the following communes:
 
Alès (partly)
Castelnau-Valence
Deaux
Euzet
Martignargues
Méjannes-lès-Alès
Monteils
Saint-Césaire-de-Gauzignan
Saint-Étienne-de-l'Olm
Saint-Hilaire-de-Brethmas
Saint-Hippolyte-de-Caton
Saint-Jean-de-Ceyrargues
Saint-Maurice-de-Cazevieille
Vézénobres

References

Cantons of Gard